The Bank of Central African States (BEAC) is a central bank that serves six central African countries which form the Economic and Monetary Community of Central Africa:

Cameroon
Central African Republic
Chad
Equatorial Guinea
Gabon
Republic of the Congo

In December 2010, a WikiLeaks memo dated June 3, 2005, said that Gabonese officials working for the Bank of Central African States stole US$36 million over a period of five years from the pooled reserves, giving much of the money to members of France's two main political parties.

Governors
Philibert Andzembe of Gabon was Governor of the Bank of Central African States from July 2007 until October 2009, when he was fired by the new president of Gabon, Ali Bongo, in response to a bank scandal in which $28.3 million went missing from the bank's Paris branch. Jean Félix Mamalepot, also from Gabon, was Governor for the preceding 17 years.

 Christian Joudiou (1973 - 1978) 
 Casimir Oyé-Mba (1978 - 1990) 
 Jean-Félix Mamalepot (1990 - April 2007) 
 Philibert Andzembe (July 2007 - June 2008) 
Lucas Abaga Nchama (2008 - 2017)
Abbas Mahamat Tolli (2017 - to date)

See also
Banque Centrale des États de l'Afrique de l'Ouest (BCEAO)
Central banks and currencies of Africa
CFA Franc
Central African CFA franc
Economy of Africa
Economy of the Central African Republic
Economy of Cameroon
Economy of Chad
Economy of the Republic of the Congo
Economy of Equatorial Guinea
Economy of Gabon

References

External links

  Official site of Banque des Etats de l'Afrique Centrale

Central African States
Economy of the Central African Republic
Economy of Cameroon
Economy of Chad
Economy of the Republic of the Congo
Economy of Equatorial Guinea
Economy of Gabon
Banks of the Central African Republic
Banks of Cameroon
Banks of Chad
Banks of the Republic of the Congo
Banks of Equatorial Guinea
Banks of Gabon
Banks established in 1972
Cameroon–Central African Republic relations
Central African Republic–Chad relations
Cameroon–Chad relations
Cameroon–Equatorial Guinea relations
Central African Republic–Republic of the Congo relations
Cameroon–Gabon relations
Cameroon–Republic of the Congo relations